The Robert Morris Colonials college football team represents Robert Morris University in the National Collegiate Athletic Association (NCAA) Division I Football Championship Subdivision. The Colonials are currently football-only members of the Big South Conference. The program has had 3 head coaches since it began play during the 1994 season.

Robert Morris has played 273 games over 25 seasons, appearing in 1 postseason game.

Key

Coaches

Notes

References

Robert Morris

Robert Morris Colonials football coaches